The 1976 Michigan State Spartans football team is an American football team that represented Michigan State University in the 1976 Big Ten Conference football season. In their first season under head coach Darryl Rogers, the Spartans compiled a 4–6–1 overall record (3–5 against Big Ten opponents) and finished in a three-way tie for seventh place in the Big Ten Conference.

Seven Spartans were selected by either the Associated Press (AP) or the United Press International (UPI) for the 1976 All-Big Ten Conference football teams: tight end Mike Cobb (AP-1, UPI-1); defensive back Tommy Hannon (AP-1, UPI-1); flanker Kirk Gibson (AP-2, UPI-2); center Al Pitts (AP-2, UPI-2); defensive tackle Larry Bethea (AP-2, UPI-2); offensive tackle Tony Bruggenthies (AP-2); and defensive end Otto Smith (UPI-2).

Schedule

Roster
 DB No. 16 Mark Anderson, Fr.
 TE Mike Cobb, Sr.
 WR Kirk Gibson, So.
 LB No, 57 Larry Savage, Fr.

Game summaries

Michigan

On October 9, 1976, Michigan State played its cross-state rival Michigan in the annual battle for the Paul Bunyan Trophy. The Wolverines had won six straight games with the last victory for the Spartans dating back to 1969. Michigan extended the streak to seven games with a 42-10 victory at Michigan Stadium. Michigan's 42 points was the most it had scored against Michigan State since 1947.

Fullback Rob Lytle rushed for 180 yards on 10 carries, including a 45-yard gain on a fake punt and a 75-yard touchdown run in the first quarter. After the game, Bo Schembechler said of Lytle, "If that guy isn't an All-American, I don't know who is." Lytle added, "All backs like to break away on a long one like that. It was the longest run I've had at Michigan. In fact, I think this was my biggest day ever." Harlan Huckleby rushed for 126 yards and three touchdowns on 23 carries. Russell Davis added 91 yards on 13 carries. In all, the Wolverines rushed for 442 yards on 62 carries against the Spartans. Quarterback Rick Leach completed five of seven passes for 93 yards and rushed for 36 yards on 11 carries. Wolfman Jerry Zuver scored Michigan's final touchdown on a 60-yard interception return in the fourth quarter.

In the AP Poll released on the Monday after the game, Michigan retained its #1 ranking with 57 out of 60 first-place votes and 1,194 points out of a possible 1,200 points. Pittsburgh was ranked #2 with the remaining three first-place votes.

References

Michigan State
Michigan State Spartans football seasons
Michigan State Spartans football